Chalmaly (Salmalı) is a rural locality (a selo) and the administrative centre of Chalmalinsky Selsoviet, Sharansky District, Bashkortostan, Russia. The population was 563 as of 2010. There are 13 street.

Geography 
Chalmaly is located 10 km southwest of Sharan (the district's administrative centre) by road. Dyurmenevo is the nearest rural locality.

References 

Rural localities in Sharansky District